1945 Meistaradeildin was the third season of Meistaradeildin, the top tier of the Faroese football league system. The teams were separated in three groups based on geographical criteria. KÍ Klaksvík defeated SÍ Sørvágur 1–0 in the championship final.

Qualifying round

East
B36 and HB played only once against each other.

West
MB withdrew after its first game. A playoff was held between SÍ and SÍF to decide who would advance.

Match played on 25 July.

|}

South

|}

Semifinal
Match played on 12 August.

|}

Final
The match was played in Tórshavn on 19 August.

|}

References
Faroe Islands Premier League at Faroe Soccer (choose 1945)
RSSSF

Meistaradeildin seasons
Faroe
Faroe